Wat Bang Nom Kho is a Buddhist temple in Sena district, Ayutthaya Province, Thailand.  The temple was made famous by  who was renowned for blowing the Diamond Armour Yant onto the foreheads of his disciples.  According to legend, many of these disciples, after death, were found to have an impression of the Yant mysteriously embedded into their skulls.  The Yant was allegedly revealed to Luang Por Phan in a dream, which led him to its discovery on a metal template hidden within a Chedi.

Luang Por Phan was also reputed to have received the ability to make powder based amulets of Buddha images sitting on animals from a spirit that appeared as a mayfly.  These amulets are extremely sought after and expensive due to their reputed powers.

References

External links
 http://www.watbangnomkho.com

Bang Nom Kho